Imran Butt (born 16 July 1988) is Pakistani field hockey player who plays as a goalkeeper for the Pakistan national team. He is the brother of former Pakistani Hockey player Rehan Butt.

International career
Butt started his career in 2012. He was one of two goalkeepers in the squad at the 2012 Summer Olympics in London, UK but he didn't play any games because he was one of the reserves. His first call-up for the national team was the 2011 Asian Champions Trophy, but he played his first game for the national team at the 2012 Champions Trophy. He was also a part of the 2018 World Cup squad. He played 156 international matches for Pakistan team and he declared his retirement in Hockey World Cup in Bhubaneswar, India.

References

External links

1988 births
Living people
Pakistani male field hockey players
Male field hockey goalkeepers
Field hockey players from Lahore
Asian Games medalists in field hockey
Field hockey players at the 2014 Asian Games
Field hockey players at the 2018 Asian Games
2018 Men's Hockey World Cup players
Asian Games silver medalists for Pakistan
Medalists at the 2014 Asian Games
Pakistani people of Kashmiri descent
South Asian Games gold medalists for Pakistan
South Asian Games medalists in field hockey